William Perry Eveland (12 February 1864 – 24 July 1916) was a missionary bishop of the Methodist Episcopal Church, elected in 1912 and serving in the U.S. and in Southeast Asia.

He was born 12 February 1864 in Harrisburg, Pennsylvania.  He began a preaching ministry in 1888, joining the traveling ministry of the Central Pennsylvania Annual Conference of the M.E. Church in 1891.  He graduated from Dickinson College, Carlisle, Pennsylvania in 1892.

Prior to his election to the episcopacy, he served as a pastor and an educator.  He served as the president of Methodist-related Williamsport Dickinson Seminary (now, Lycoming College) from 1905 to 1912.  He was appointed as missionary bishop over Southeastern Asia.  However, his service as a bishop was short: he died on 24 July 1916 following an electrical accident at Mount Holly Springs, Pennsylvania, where he is also buried.

Selected writings
Inaugural Address, Williamsport Dickinson, pamphlet, 16 pp., 1908.

References
Leete, Frederick DeLand, Methodist Bishops.  Nashville, The Methodist Publishing House, 1948.

See also
List of bishops of the United Methodist Church

1864 births
1916 deaths
People from Harrisburg, Pennsylvania
American Methodist bishops
Bishops of the Methodist Episcopal Church
Methodist missionaries in Asia
American Methodist missionaries
People from Williamsport, Pennsylvania
American speechwriters
Methodist missionary bishops
Dickinson College alumni
Lycoming College faculty
Accidental deaths in Pennsylvania
Accidental deaths by electrocution